Raa Raa the Noisy Lion is a British stop motion animated children's television programme first broadcast in May 2011, which is shown on CBeebies. It features a group of animal-based characters and their adventures and activities through the Jingly Jangly Jungle. The show is narrated by Lorraine Kelly and is produced by Chapman Entertainment (series one and two) and DreamWorks Classic Productions (series three).

Characters
Raa Raa (voiced by Bradley Shedden in series one and two, Tyler Coleman in series three): A fun-loving and noisy little lion.
Topsy (voiced by Eden Jarrett): A giraffe who loves to read. She is the tallest and oldest of Raa Raa's friends. She can sometimes be bossy, but she is the one that wants to help her friends as good as she can.
Zebby (voiced by Mia Hann): A kind and gentle zebra who sometimes gets hungry.
Huffty (voiced by Oliver Dillon): An elephant who loves music and giving his friends a ride on his train.
Ooo Ooo (voiced by Jamie Oram in series one and two, and Alexander Molony in series three): A monkey who is fun and likes to swing on vines.
Crocky  (voiced by Max Miller): A crocodile who likes to hang out by the river and ride in his log boat. 
Pia (voiced by Hayden Hunter): A parrot who likes to fly high in the air. She debuted in series three.
Scuttle: A purple spider who has eight legs. She debuted in series three.

Episodes

References

External links
 
  (archived)
 

2011 British television series debuts
2018 British television series endings
2010s British animated television series
British stop-motion animated television series
British children's animated adventure television series
British children's animated comedy television series
British preschool education television series
Animated preschool education television series
2010s preschool education television series
BBC children's television shows
CBeebies
DreamWorks Classics
Animated television series about monkeys
Animated television series about birds
Animated television series about elephants
Animated television series about lions
Fictional crocodilians
Fictional giraffes
Fictional zebras
Television series about spiders
English-language television shows